The Four Paragons of the Early Tang is a group name for four Chinese poets of the early Tang dynasty: Luo Binwang, Lu Zhaolin, Wang Bo, and Yang Jiong.

According to a Tang biography of Yang Dong, the four people enjoyed same popularity and fame in China. They thrived in the time of Emperor Gaozong.

The Four Eminences abolished the Gongti Style which had been used since the Southern Qi and Liang dynasty. The Wǔyán Lǜshī (Chinese: 五言律詩) passed through a critical phase of development under the four people's influence.

The rank of the Four Eminences has been the spotlight of discussion. Yang Jiong expressed his unwillingness to be put behind Wang Bo and in front of Lu Zhaolin.

See also 
Tang poetry
Classical Chinese poetry

References

Tang dynasty poets
7th-century Chinese poets
Articles about multiple people in pre-Tang China
Quartets